Elections to Metropolitan Borough of Southwark were held in 1922.

The borough had ten wards which returned between 3 and 9 members.

Election result

|}

References

Council elections in the London Borough of Southwark
1922 in London
1922 English local elections